Azamat-Yurt is a rural locality (a selo) in Gudermessky District, Chechnya.

Administrative and municipal status 
Municipally, Azamat-Yurt is incorporated as Azamat-Yurtovskoye rural settlement. It is the administrative center of the municipality and is the only settlement included in it.

Geography 

Azamat-Yurt is located on the right bank of the Terek River.

The nearest settlements to Azamat-Yurt are Paraboch in the north, Kharkovskoye and Pervomayskoye in the north-east, Engel-Yurt, Kadi-Yurt and Sovetskoye in the south-east, Komsomolskoye in the south-west, and Khangish-Yurt in the west.

Name 
The name of the village comes from two words: Azamat, the name of the founder, and yurt, a Chechen word for a village.

History 
Azamat-Yurt was founded in 1859.

In 1944, after the genocide and deportation of the Chechen and Ingush people and the Chechen-Ingush ASSR was abolished, the village of Azamat-Yurt was renamed, and settled by people from the neighbouring republic of Dagestan. From 1944 to 1957, it was a part of the Dagestan ASSR.

In 1957, when the Vaynakh people returned and the Chechen-Ingush ASSR was restored, the village regained its old name, Azamat-Yurt.

Population 
 1990 Census: 923
 2002 Census: 1,226
 2010 Census: 1,500
 2019 estimate: 1,941

According to the results of the 2010 Census, the majority of residents of Azamat-Yurt were ethnic Chechens.

Teips 
Members of mainly the following teips live in Azamat-Yurt:

 Aitkhalloy,
 Shonoy,
 Shirdoy,
 Tsontoroy.

Education 
Azamat-Yurt hosts one secondary school.

References 

Rural localities in Gudermessky District